Crossidius testaceus is a species of long-horned beetle in the family Cerambycidae. It is found in Central America and North America.

Subspecies
 Crossidius testaceus maculicollis Casey, 1912
 Crossidius testaceus testaceus LeConte, 1851

References

Further reading

 
 
 
 

Trachyderini